Harbor Fish Market is a prominent and historic fish market in the Old Port of Portland, Maine, United States. It was established in the late 19th century in the city's working waterfront, and is still doing business out of its original home at 9 Custom House Wharf, which was owned by the same family between circa 1807 and 2022. It is popular with both locals and tourists. In the 1990s, their store frontage appeared in photographs so often that the family trademarked the image.

The business was given its current name in 1966, when Ben Alfiero Sr. and his older brother John purchased the business. Ben became the sole owner in 1975, later assisted by his sons Nick, Ben Jr. and Mike. Ben Sr. retired in 2000.

As the business continued to grow, a larger processing plant was opened on Commercial Street. A second retail location, in North Deering, was opened around the same time.

When fishing restrictions were introduced in the late 1980s, Harbor Fish closed its processing plant and moved it back to its newly expanded Custom House Wharf location. The original store was just over twenty feet wide.

The company opened a second location in March 2022, located on U.S. Route 1 in Scarborough, Maine, in a space shared with Rosemont Market.

Notable patrons 
Julia Child, Billy Joel and Mainer native Patrick Dempsey have all visited the store.

Publications 

 Harbor Fish Market (Nick Alfiero, Down East Books, 2013)

References 

Companies based in Portland, Maine
Culture of Portland, Maine
Fish markets
19th-century establishments in Maine
Retail companies established in the 19th century